The Cod. Pal. germ. 339 (CPG 339) is an illustrated manuscript of 
Wolfram von Eschenbach's Parzival, created in Hagenau in the 1440s in the workshop of Diebold Lauber.

External links
facsimile

1440s books
German poetry
Literary illuminated manuscripts
Medieval literature